Kenneth Cooper Annakin, OBE (10 August 1914 – 22 April 2009) was an English film director.

His career spanned half a century, beginning in the early 1940s and ending in 2002, and in the 1960s he was noticed by critics with large-scale adventure epic and comedies films, like Those Magnificent Men in Their Flying Machines, Battle of the Bulge, The Biggest Bundle of Them All  and Monte Carlo or Bust!. During his career, Annakin directed nearly 50 pictures.

Biography 
Annakin was born in and grew up in Beverley, East Riding of Yorkshire where he attended the local grammar school. After leaving school he became a trainee income tax inspector in the city of Hull. Annakin subsequently decided to emigrate to New Zealand, and travelled around the world in a variety of jobs.

He was compere and stage manager of Eugene Permanent Waving Company's roadshow, touring the Northern provinces. When World War II broke out, Annakin became a firefighter in Soho, then joined the Royal Air Force.

Documentaries
Injured in the Liverpool Blitz, Annakin joined the RAF Film Unit, where he worked as a camera operator on propaganda films for the Ministry of Information and the British Council. We Serve (1942), a recruiting film for women, was directed by Carol Reed, who made Annakin his assistant director; Annakin subsequently directed several training films for Verity Films, a group led by Sydney Box, who was soon to become head of Gainsborough Pictures.

His early documentaries included London 1942 (1942), A Ride with Uncle Joe (1943), Make Fruitful the Land (1945), We of the West Riding (1945), English Criminal Justice (1946), It Began on the Clyde (1946) and Fenlands (1946).

Feature films and Gainsborough Pictures
Annakin had made a number of documentaries for Sydney Box, and when Box took over as head of Gainsborough Pictures he brought Annakin with him and assigned him to his first feature, Holiday Camp (1947). It was a solid hit and launched Annakin's career. Box called in Annakin to replace Michael Charlton, who was directing Miranda (1948) with Glynis Johns. The resulting film was another success.

Broken Journey (1948) with Phyllis Calvert was a commercial disappointment. However, Quartet (1948), an anthology film based on stories by W. Somerset Maugham, for which Annakin directed one segment, was well received.

Holiday Camp featured the Huggetts, a working-class family living in suburban England headed by Jack Warner and Kathleen Harrison. They were spun off into their own vehicle directed by Annakin, Here Come the Huggetts (1948) with Petula Clark, Jane Hylton, and Susan Shaw as their young daughters, Amy Veness as their grandmother and Diana Dors as their cousin. It was popular and led to Vote for Huggett (1949) and The Huggetts Abroad (1949).

Associated British
Annakin moved to Associated British Pictures Corporation, for whom he directed Landfall (1949), a war film; and Double Confession (1950), a thriller. He did another installment for an anthology movie based on Maugham stories, Trio (1950).

For producer George Brown, Annakin did the comedy Hotel Sahara (1951) with Peter Ustinov and Yvonne de Carlo.

Walt Disney
Annakin then received an offer from Walt Disney to make The Story of Robin Hood and His Merrie Men (1952) with Richard Todd.

He made an action film set during the Malayan Emergency, the United Artists film The Planter's Wife (1952) with Jack Hawkins and Claudette Colbert, which was a big hit in Britain.

Disney reunited Annakin and Todd on The Sword and the Rose (1953), co-starring Glynis Johns; it was a commercial disappointment.

Annakin made a comedy, You Know What Sailors Are (1954) then did another imperial adventure story with Hawkins, The Seekers (1954).

He returned to comedy for Value for Money (1955) with John Gregson and Diana Dors, for Rank; Loser Takes All (1956) with Johns, based on a script by Graham Greene, for British Lion Films; and Three Men in a Boat (1956) with Laurence Harvey and Jimmy Edwards for Romulus Films. Three Men in a Boat was especially popular.

Annakin made Across the Bridge (1957) with Rod Steiger from a story by Graham Greene. This would be Annakin's favourite film.

He travelled to South Africa to make another adventure story, Nor the Moon by Night (1958) for Rank, with Michael Craig and Belinda Lee. Around this time he was credited as a writer on Mission in Morocco (1959), though he did not direct it.

Disney called again and hired Annakin to make a mountaineering tale, Third Man on the Mountain (1959). They kept him on for Swiss Family Robinson (1960), which Walt Disney's nephew, Roy, considered "one of the greatest family adventure films of all time and a favourite for generations of moviegoers". It was a huge hit.

Annakin returned to comedy with Very Important Person (1961) with James Robertson Justice. He travelled to South Africa once more for The Hellions (1962) with Richard Todd.

Annakin did some British comedies with Leslie Phillips, Stanley Baxter and a young Julie Christie: The Fast Lady (1962) and Crooks Anonymous (1962).

Producer
Annakin was hired by Darryl F. Zanuck to direct the British and (uncredited) French and American interior segments in The Longest Day (1962), which was nominated for an Academy Award for Best Picture, eventually losing out to Lawrence of Arabia.

Annakin then made The Informers (1963) with Nigel Patrick for Rank.

June 16, 1965, saw the release of Those Magnificent Men in Their Flying Machines. At the time it was Annakin's most ambitious project, and Zanuck, the head of the 20th Century-Fox Studio, endorsed the British period comedy film. In this project, Annakin co-wrote, produced and directed an international ensemble cast, including Stuart Whitman, Sarah Miles, Robert Morley, Terry-Thomas, James Fox, Red Skelton, Benny Hill, Jean-Pierre Cassel, Gert Fröbe and Alberto Sordi. The story, revolving around the craze of early aviation circa 1910, is about a pompous newspaper magnate (Morley) who is convinced, by his daughter (Miles) and fiancée (Fox), to organize an air race from London to Paris. A large sum of money is offered to the winner, and a variety of characters are drawn to participate. The film received favourable reviews, in which it was described as funny, colourful and clever, and was said to have captured the early enthusiasm for aviation. It was treated as a major production, one of only three full-length 70 mm Todd-AO Fox releases in 1965, with an intermission and musical interlude part of the original screenings. Because of the Todd-AO process, the film was an exclusive roadshow feature, initially shown in deluxe Cinerama venues, where customers needed reserved seats purchased ahead of time. The film grossed $31,111,111 theatrically. Audience reaction both in first release and even today, is nearly universal in assessing the film as one of the "classic" aviation films. For its writing, Annakin and Jack Davies received an Academy Award nomination.

Annakin directed the big-scale war film Battle of the Bulge the same year for producer Philip Yordan and Cinerama. He also started writing a follow up to Flying Machine called Monte Carlo or Bust.

Annakin planned to make epics about the Spanish Armada, Cortez and the Indian Mutiny, and a film about martians. None of these were made. Instead, he made The Long Duel (1967) in India for Rank with Yul Brynner, then The Biggest Bundle of Them All (1968) for MGM in Italy.

This was followed by Monte Carlo or Bust (1969) for Paramount Pictures, which Annakin produced and directed from his own script and story. It was an attempt to replicate the success of Those Magnificent Men',' but was not as well received.

Annakin continued to travel widely with his films: The Call of the Wild (1972) was shot in Finland, with Charlton Heston; Paper Tiger (1975), with David Niven in Malaysia.

Hollywood
Thanks to the money made from his films, Annakin moved to the south of France with his family. In 1978, Annakin left France and moved to Los Angeles. According to his autobiography, this was due to running foul of criminals while attempting to get funding for a new project, who threatened his family.

There he made a series of films for TV: Murder at the Mardi Gras (1978), The Pirate (1978) from a novel by Harold Robbins and Institute for Revenge (1979). He wouldn't stay only in America, as he travelled to Europe for The Fifth Musketeer (1979). Cheaper to Keep Her (1981) and then Australia for the musical The Pirate Movie (1982). Annakin's last completed film was The New Adventures of Pippi Longstocking (1988) which he directed, produced and co wrote.

Annakin would continue to work on more screenplays, as well as attempt to develop a new film about Amelia Earhardt called Redwing. His 1992 project, the historical drama Genghis Khan was not completed, as the company financing it went bust."

Autobiography
In 2001 Annakin released a highly regarded autobiography So You Wanna Be A Director? published by Tomahawk Press. Considered "a classic among directors' autobiographies" it has forewords by both Richard Attenborough and Mike Leigh. In its review, the Directors Guild of America stated So You Wanna Be a Director? is an entertaining autobiography through which seasoned directors and aspirants alike can enjoy and learn from a man with such a versatile and long-lived career. If Annakin tells of his exasperation over trying to coax performances out of producers' girlfriends, the bad behaviour – and sometimes the drug problems – of certain stars and the vagaries of international film financing, he's providing tales that are as cautionary today as when he lived them.

Annakin was honored as a Disney Legend by The Walt Disney Company in March 2002. He is only the second film director to be so honoured. He was also awarded an OBE the same year for service to the film industry and received an honorary Doctor of Letters degree from Hull University.

He died on 22 April 2009, the same day as Jack Cardiff, who had been his cinematographer on the 1979 film The Fifth Musketeer. A daughter from a previous marriage predeceased him. The cause of his death was myocardial infarction and stroke.

Claims were made that George Lucas took the name for Anakin Skywalker in Star Wars from his fellow film director; however, Lucas's publicist denied this following Annakin's death in 2009.

 Filmography 

 London 1942 (1943)
 Make Fruitful the Land (1945)
 We of the West Riding (1946)
 English Criminal Justice (1946)
 It Began on the Clyde (1946)
 Fenlands (1946)
 Holiday Camp (1947)
 Miranda (1948)
 Broken Journey (1948)
 Quartet (1948)
 Here Come the Huggetts (1948)
 Vote for Huggett (1949)
 The Huggetts Abroad (1949)
 Landfall (1949)
 Double Confession (1950)
 Hotel Sahara (1951)
 The Story of Robin Hood and His Merrie Men (1952)
 The Planter's Wife (1952)
 The Sword and the Rose (1953)
 You Know What Sailors Are (1954)
 The Seekers (1954)
 Value for Money (1955)
 Loser Takes All (1956)
 Three Men in a Boat (1956)
 Across the Bridge (1957)
 Nor the Moon by Night (1958)
 Third Man on the Mountain (1959)
 Swiss Family Robinson (1960)
 Very Important Person (1961)
 The Hellions (1961)
 The Fast Lady (1962)
 The Longest Day (1962)
 Crooks Anonymous (1962)
 The Informers (1963)
 Those Magnificent Men in Their Flying Machines (1965)
 Battle of the Bulge (1965)
 The Long Duel (1967)
 The Biggest Bundle of Them All (1968)
 Monte Carlo or Bust! (1969)
 The Call of the Wild (1972)
 Paper Tiger (1975)
 The Pirate (1978)
 Institute for Revenge (1979)
 The Fifth Musketeer (1979)
 Cheaper to Keep Her (1981)
 The Pirate Movie (1982)
 The New Adventures of Pippi Longstocking (1988)
 Genghis Khan'' (1992) (unreleased)

References

External links 
 
 Ken Annakin biography at BFI Screenonline
 AP Obituary in the Los Angeles Times
 Obituary in The Times
 Obituary in The Guardian
 Obituary in The Independent
 Obituary in The Daily Telegraph
 

1914 births
2009 deaths
20th-century English businesspeople
20th-century English male writers
20th-century English screenwriters
Burials at Westwood Village Memorial Park Cemetery
Civil servants in the Ministry of Information (United Kingdom)
English film directors
English film producers
English male screenwriters
Mountaineering film directors
Officers of the Order of the British Empire
People educated at Beverley Grammar School
People from Beverley
Royal Air Force airmen
Royal Air Force personnel of World War II